The Swartz Printing Company Building is a historic two-story building in Omaha, Nebraska. It was built in 1910 for the Swartz Printing Company, a commercial printing press and book publisher owned by Maynard T. and Milton J. Swartz. The building was designed by architect Jacob M. Nachtigall. It has been listed on the National Register of Historic Places since July 3, 2007.

References

National Register of Historic Places in Omaha, Nebraska
Early Commercial architecture in the United States
Commercial buildings completed in 1910
1910 establishments in Nebraska